The Veer-class corvettes of the Indian Navy are a customised Indian variant of the Soviet . They form the 22nd Killer Missile Vessel Squadron.

Service history
Eight vessels of this class inherit their names from the 25th Killer missile boat squadron, which attacked and sank two destroyers, a minesweeper and various other support vessels off Karachi during Operation Trident and Operation Python of the Indo-Pakistani War of 1971.

The last two vessels of this class were built as the upgraded Tarantul V with 16 SS-N-25 'Switchblade' / URAN E Missiles, 1 OTO Melara 76 mm instead of the AK-176, and MR 352 Positiv-E (NATO: Cross Dome) Radar.

On 28 April 2016, INS Veer and INS Nipat were the first Veer-class corvettes to be decommissioned from the Indian Navy.

Ships of the class

INS Veer
INS Veer was the lead ship of her class and served in the Indian Navy from 26 March 1987 to 28 April 2016. INS Veer was commissioned at Poti, Soviet Union (now in Georgia) on 26 March 1987. Lieutenant Commander Anup Singh was the commissioning Commanding Officer of the ship. The ship has also been forward deployed off the coast of Gujarat, and India's maritime border on numerous occasions to protect offshore assets. After completing 29 years of commissioned service, INS Veer was decommissioned on 28 April 2016. At the time of decommissioning, the ship's commanding officer was Cdr B Charish K Pal, and the ship was assigned to the 22nd Killer Squadron. Veer and Nipat, which was also decommissioned on the same day, were the first Veer class corvettes to be decommissioned from the Indian Navy.

INS Nirbhik
INS Nirbhik served in the Indian Navy from 21 December 1987 to 11 January 2018. She was commissioned at Poti, Soviet Union (now in Georgia) on 21 December 1987 with Commander V R Naphade as the commissioning Commanding Officer. During her three decades of service, she was forward deployed along the Gujarat coast for patrolling and she participated in numerous operations including Operation Parakram and Operation Vijay. The ship was decommissioned at Naval Dockyard in Mumbai on 11 January 2018 and her decommissioning Commanding Officer was Commander Anand Mukundan.

INS Nipat
INS Nipat served in the Indian Navy from 5 December 1988 to 28 April 2016. INS Nipat was commissioned at Poti, Soviet Union (now in Georgia) on 5 December 1988. Lieutenant Commander GV Babu was the commissioning Commanding Officer of the ship. The ship was manned by a crew of about 100 officers and sailors. The ship was propelled by four gas turbine engines, and was designed to attain a maximum speed of 42 knots. These ship was designed to carry four Surface to Surface Guided Missiles, one Medium Range Anit-Aircraft Gun (an AK 176) and a Close in Weapon System with two AK 630 Guns and associated Radar. The original INS Nipat served as a frontrunner, alongside sister ship INS Veer during the naval offensive on Karachi harbour in the Indo-Pakistani War of 1971. The ship has also been forward deployed off the coast of Gujarat, and India's maritime border on numerous occasions to protect offshore assets. After completing 28 years of commissioned service, INS Nipat was decommissioned on 28 April 2016. At the time of decommissioning, the ship's commanding officer was Cdr D Chakrapani, and the ship was assigned to the 22nd Killer Squadron. Nipat and Veer, which was also decommissioned on the same day, were the first Veer class corvettes to be decommissioned from the Indian Navy.

INS Nirghat

INS Nirghat  served in Indian Navy from 15 December 1989 to 11 January 2018. She was commissioned at Poti, Soviet Union (now in Georgia) on 15 December 1989 with Commodore S Mampully as the commissioning Commanding Officer. During her three decades of service, she was forward deployed along the Gujarat coast for patrolling and she participated in numerous operations including Operation Parakram and Operation Vijay. The ship was decommissioned at Naval Dockyard in Mumbai on 11 January 2018 and her last Commanding Officer was Commander Mohammed Ikram.

INS Pralaya

INS Pralaya is currently in active service with the Indian Navy. INS Pralaya is an upgraded Veer class corvette of the Indian Navy, the Veer class are based on the Tarantul Class (Project 1241.1) with the last vessels being based on the Project 1241.8. The INS Pralaya (K91) was Laid Down on 2 May 1998, Launched on 14 December 2000, and commissioned on 18 December 2002. She was built at the Goa Ship Yard from plating and a CKD (Completely Knocked Down) kit supplied by the Russians. Her sister ship the INS Prabal (K92) is of the same configuration but was built by Mazagaon Docks Limited.
Modified with Russian input, the weapons & sensor fit is similar to that of the Project 25A Class corvette, INS Kirch. Radars include a MR 352 Positiv-E radar, a Garpun Bal E, MR-123 AK-630 directors and a BEL Lynx gunfire control radar. The vessel is armed with four KT-184 quad launchers for the sixteen 3M24E anti-ship missiles with a range of 130 km. The AK-176 of the original Tarantul has been replaced by an Oto Melara 76/62 Compact, the vessel also has two AK-630s and one Strela 2M MANPAD with 12 reloads for air defence.

See also

List of active Indian Navy ships
List of ships of the Indian Navy

References

 
Corvette classes
India–Soviet Union relations